"Did I Shave My Legs for This?" is a song co-written and recorded by American country music artist Deana Carter.  It was released in November 1997 as the sixth single and title track from the album Did I Shave My Legs for This?.  The song reached #25 on the Billboard Hot Country Singles & Tracks chart.  The song was written by Carter and Rhonda Hart.

Content
The song is a lament from the point of view of a woman who lives in a mobile home with her husband. The couple had a romantic night planned, and the woman prepared by going to a beauty salon, buying a new dress and shoes, and shaving her legs, but when she arrives home, expecting "flowers and wine" from her husband, she is disappointed to see that he is interested only in watching television and drinking beer.

Chart performance

Awards and nominations
The song was nominated for both Best Country Song and Best Female Country Vocal Performance at the 1998 Grammy Awards; it lost to Bob Carlisle's "Butterfly Kisses" and Trisha Yearwood's "How Do I Live", respectively.

Covers and parodies
The song was parodied by country music parodist Cledus T. Judd as "Did I Shave My Back for This?", from his 1998 album of the same name. Carter appears briefly in the music video for the song.

References

1997 singles
1995 songs
Deana Carter songs
Songs written by Deana Carter
Song recordings produced by Chris Farren (country musician)
Capitol Records Nashville singles